Good for You is the debut studio album by American rapper Aminé, released on July 28, 2017, by CLBN and Republic Records. The album features guest appearances from Ty Dolla Sign, Nelly, Offset, Charlie Wilson and Kehlani.

Good for You was supported by five singles: "Caroline", "Heebiejeebies", "Turf", "Wedding Crashers" and "Spice Girl". The album received generally positive reviews from critics and debuted at number 31 on the US Billboard 200.

Background
On June 22, 2017, Aminé revealed the album's title name, cover along with its release date.

Promotion
The lead single from the album, "Caroline", was released on March 9, 2016. The music video for the song was released on June 1, 2016. It peaked at number 11 on the US Billboard Hot 100.

"Heebiejeebies" was released as the album's second single on May 26, 2017. The song features a guest appearance from American singer Kehlani. It was later sent to urban contemporary radio on March 6, 2018.

"Turf" was released on June 16, 2017, as the album's third single. "Wedding Crashers" was released on July 21, 2017, as the album's fourth single. The song features a guest appearance from American rapper Offset.

"Spice Girl" was released on August 15, 2017, to rhythmic contemporary radio as the album's fifth single. The music video for the song was released on October 10, 2017.

Promotional singles
The album's first promotional single, "Blinds", was released on June 30, 2017.

Critical reception 

Good for You was met with generally positive reviews. At Metacritic, which assigns a normalized rating out of 100 to reviews from mainstream publications, the album received an average score of 77, based on four reviews. Aggregator AnyDecentMusic? gave it 6.9 out of 10, based on their assessment of the critical consensus.

Aaron McKrell of HipHopDX gave a positive review, stating "This debut shines so brightly in comparison to what Aminé's contemporaries are passing off that it may be easy to forget that it is not exactly a groundbreaking album. Regardless, the rookie should be commended for crafting an honest, entertaining and revealing album". Briana Younger of Pitchfork wrote: "Good for You, most of which hinge on love interests old and new, underscored by a playful outlook that's channeled into bubbly, off-center production. It's far from serious but stops just short of turn-up—more like the soundtrack for an almost-sober drive home." A. Harmony of Exclaim! said, "Even in its weighty moments, the simple melodies, infectious hooks and liberal dashes of humour will keep your spirits up from start to finish. Good for You is a satisfying, well-rounded effort". Andrew Colvert of Gig Soup praised the album, stating, "Even if he's not the most gifted creatively right now, he's still in his early 20s and doesn't confine himself to just hip hop for inspiration. The future looks as bright as the colors on his album cover".

Writing for Sputnikmusic, Elliott S. Edwards concluded, "Good for You isn't a pleasant listen because Aminé is so gosh darn happy, it's because it appears so out of step with a relentlessly negative and dour mood. We could all do with just that much more happiness in our lives". Preezy of XXL said, "Good for You proves his meteoric rise up the charts is far from the start of the ending and more of precursor of what's to come. His versatility shines as he offers feel-good moments with more thought-provoking material".

Commercial performance
Good for You debuted at number 31 on the US Billboard 200, selling 13,000 copies pure sales in its first week. On January 16, 2018, the album was certified gold by the Recording Industry Association of America (RIAA) for combined sales and album-equivalent units of over 500,000 units in the United States.

Track listing

Notes
  signifies a co-producer
  signifies an additional producer

Sample credits
  "Spice Girl" contains a sample from "Wannabe" written by Victoria Beckham, Melanie Brown, Emma Bunton, Melanie Chisholm, Geraldine Halliwell, Matt Rowe and Richard Stannard, as performed by Spice Girls.

Personnel

Performers
 Aminé – primary artist
 Ty Dolla Sign – featured artist (track 1)
 Nelly – featured artist (track 2)
 Offset – featured artist (track 7)
 Charlie Wilson – featured artist (track 11), background vocals (track 9), additional vocals (track 1)
 Kehlani – featured artist (track 15)
 Marche' Black – background vocals (track 3)
 Girlpool – additional vocals (track 4), background vocals (track 14)
 Sheron Page – additional vocals (track 6)
 Leon Bridges – additional vocals (track 8)
 Illegal Civilization – background vocals (track 14)

Musicians
 Chuck Palmer – conductor, string arranger (track 1)
 Dave Eggar – cello, string arranger (tracks 1, 11)
 Rachel Golub – violin (tracks 1, 11)
 Jessica Meyer – viola (tracks 1, 11)
 Tony Maceli – bass (tracks 1, 11)

Technical
 Morning Estrada – recording engineer (tracks 1, 2, 4–6, 8–10, 12, 14), mixer (tracks 6, 12, 15)
 Jaycen Joshua – mixer (tracks 1, 4, 5, 7, 13, 14)
 David Nakaji – assistant mixer (tracks 1, 4, 7, 13)
 Iván Jiménez – assistant mixer (tracks 1, 4, 7, 13)
 Alex Tumay – mixer (track 2)
 Gordie Tumay – assistant mixer (track 2)
 Aminé – recording engineer (tracks 3, 13)
 Gabe Schuman – mixer (track 3)
 Daryl "DJ Durel" McPherson – recording engineer (track 7)
 Manny Marroquin – mixer (tracks 8, 9), mixing engineer (track 11)
 Chris Galland – mixing engineer (tracks 8, 9, 11)
 Robin Florent – assistant mixer (tracks 8, 9, 11)
 Scott Desmarais – assistant mixer (tracks 8, 9, 11)
 Guy Lawrence – recording engineer (track 10)
 Ryan Gladieux – recording engineer (track 15)

Production
 Jahaan Sweet – producer (tracks 1, 12, 15)
 Pasqué – producer (tracks 1, 3, 4, 11, 13), additional producer (track 14)
 Frank Dukes – producer (tracks 2, 5, 8, 14), additional producer (track 7)
 Metro Boomin – producer (track 2)
 Murda Beatz – co-producer (track 2)
 Aminé – producer (tracks 3, 4, 6, 12, 13), co-producer (track 7)
 Girlpool – additional producer (track 4)
 Jay Prince – additional producer (track 4)
 J Gramm – additional producer (track 5), producer (track 7)
 Vegyn – producer (track 6)
 Geoffro Cause – co-producer (track 7)
 Malay – producer (tracks 9, 11)
 Guy Lawrence – producer (track 10)

Charts

Certifications

References

2017 debut albums
Aminé (rapper) albums
Republic Records albums
Albums produced by Metro Boomin
Albums produced by Murda Beatz
Albums produced by Frank Dukes
Albums produced by Malay (record producer)
Albums produced by Vegyn